Sainte-Foy  is a former city in central Quebec, Canada alongside the Saint Lawrence River. It was amalgamated into Quebec City at the start of 2002. Most of the formerly independent municipality of Sainte-Foy is located in the borough of Sainte-Foy–Sillery–Cap-Rouge — initially as one of the two constituent districts of the former borough of Sainte-Foy–Sillery. On 1 November 2009, Sainte-Foy was subdivided into four separate districts: Cité-Universitaire, Plateau, Saint-Louis, Pointe-de-Sainte-Foy, when the borough of Sainte-Foy–Sillery–Cap-Rouge was formed.

Sainte-Foy is a major suburban neighbourhood west of downtown Quebec City. It plays a large part in Quebec City's economic life, with the Jean Lesage International Airport, Université Laval, multiple shopping malls, and both bridges to the south shore of the Saint Lawrence River.

Demographics
According to the 2006 Canadian Census:

Population: 
% change (2001–2006): +5.1
Dwellings: 
Number of families: 
Area (km2): 83.87 km2
Density (persons per km2): 909.3

History
In 1669, missionary priest Pierre-Joseph-Marie Chaumonot erected a chapel for the Huron, dedicated to Notre-Dame de la Foy. The name means Our Lady of Faith. Sainte-Foy developed around the chapel, first as a small settlement of Christian Indians, added to by traders and merchants.

The Battle of Sainte-Foy on April 28, 1760, sometimes called the Battle of Quebec, was a victory for the French in the Seven Years' War (known in the United States as the French and Indian War for the North American front). Their forces were commanded by Chevalier de Lévis and defeated the British army under James Murray. This battle proved to be much bloodier than the battle of the Plains of Abraham the previous September, with higher total casualties on both sides – 833 French casualties and 1,124 British. Despite this the French were unable to take Quebec and it was to be the last French victory in the Seven Years' War, which the British ultimately won. France ceded its territories in North America east of the Mississippi River to the British.

Sainte-Foy's long-time flamboyant mayor, Andrée Boucher, was defeated when she ran for mayor of the amalgamated Quebec City. She became a radio host. In 2005, she ran again for mayor after Jean-Paul L'Allier retired. This time she won, without hiring an election team or paying for media advertisements, and with making very few public appearances or debates. She has since died since her last political position.

Amalgamation with Quebec City
On 1 January 2002 the city was merged, along with many other suburbs, with Quebec City with neither a public referendum nor widespread public approval. A vote was finally held on June 20, 2004, giving cities an opportunity to leave the new municipal structure. Only Saint-Augustin-de-Desmaures and L'Ancienne-Lorette left. Many believed that a "defusion" would lead only to an eventual and inevitable "refusion". Many people said they were discouraged from voting by the prospect of spending a lot of money undoing what had just been done. In most of the older suburbs not enough votes were cast for the vote to be valid.

Districts
 Cité universitaire – centred around Université Laval, it has a very large student population. The majority of Saint-Foy's commercial activity is found along Laurier Boulevard, such as Laurier Québec, Place Sainte-Foy and Place de la Cité shopping malls. A number of large hotels and office buildings line the boulevard and this area has become one of the city's major commercial centres.
 Saint-Louis – leafy residential area south of Laurier Boulevard towards the river. Contains the Aquarium du Québec.
 Plateau – sprawling suburban area north of Boulevard Laurier, featuring post-war single storey houses and an abundance of 1960s apartment blocks.

 Pointe-de-Sainte-Foy – recent large residential development, centred on the Campanile shopping street. The neighbourhood consists mostly of large modern condo and apartment blocks.
 L'Aéroport – industrial area centred on the Jean Lesage International Airport with many big-box stores. L'Aéroport district's land was initially part of the parish of Notre-Dame-de-Lorette —later the independent city of L'Ancienne-Lorette. L'Aéroport's territory was merged into the formerly independent city of Sainte-Foy's jurisdiction in 1971. However, L'Aéroport became a district of the former borough of Laurentien, in 2002. When Laurentien was dissolved as an administrative entity as part of the 2009 reorganization of Quebec City's boroughs, L'Aéroport became a district of Sainte-Foy–Sillery–Cap-Rouge.

Economy
Aeropro has its head office on the grounds of Jean Lesage Airport in Sainte-Foy. It conducts business charters and recreational and sightseeing flights Prior to its dissolution, regional airline Air Nova had its Quebec offices in Sainte-Foy.

Major companies operating in the district include PriceWaterhouseCoopers, Ernst & Young, Microsoft and the headquarters of SSQ Financial Group.

Sainte-Foy is at the northern end of the Quebec Bridge, which links to the south shore of the Saint Lawrence River at Lévis.

Education

Sainte-Foy is also the site of many educational institutions:

Université Laval
Cégep Sainte-Foy
Cégep Garneau
Collège de Champigny
Champlain College St. Lawrence
Rochebelle High School – 
Collège des Compagnons – 
Université du Québec École Nationale d'Administration Publique

Transport
Sainte-Foy station is a VIA Rail station on the Quebec City–Windsor Corridor. It is roughly three kilometres from the Gare d'Autocar de Ste-Foy, and ten kilometres from Jean Lesage Airport.

The Gare d'Autocar is a regional hub for Orleans Express, Intercar, the Réseau de transport de la Capitale, the Société de transport de Lévis, and several regional government-funded shuttles, for example Portneuf.

Air France has a bus service from Sainte-Foy bus station to Montreal Dorval Airport for its customers only.

Climate

Recreation

Sainte-Foy possesses has three ice hockey rinks, one sports centre, 33 soccer fields, 2 Interior Pools, 13 exterior pools, three cinemas, one theatre, Laurier Québec, Place de La Cite, and La Pyramide. Sainte-Foy also has excellent representation in all sports: the Governors in hockey, the Caravelles and Arsenal in soccer, and the Musketeers ESCC in basketball.

Notable residents
 Yves Bélanger, cinematographer and Canadian Screen Award recipient
 Sylvie Bernier, Olympic diver and 1984 gold medalist
 Lionel Fleury, president of the Canadian Amateur Hockey Association and Quebec Amateur Hockey Association
 Simon Gagné, ice hockey player
 Jean Leloup, singer and songwriter also known as "John the Wolf"
 Steve Penney, ice hockey goaltender
 Patrick Roy, ice hockey goaltender
 Marianna O'Gallagher, Irish-Quebecer historian

See also
 Sainte-Foy–Sillery–Cap-Rouge
 Municipal reorganization in Quebec
 Sillery
 Cap-Rouge
 Laurentien

References

 Modification aux arrondissements (archive Chartrand, Rene (2000). Canadian Military Heritage. Casemate Publishing. ).

External links

Neighbourhoods in Quebec City
Former municipalities in Quebec
Bus stations in Quebec
Bus transport in Quebec
Populated places disestablished in 2002
2002 disestablishments in Quebec

es:Sainte-Foy, Quebec